The Fresno State Library is the name of an academic library in Fresno, California. It serves as the main resource for recorded knowledge and information supporting the teaching, research, and service functions of the California State University, Fresno.

History
The library was established in 1911 and it was named after Henry Madden in 1981. As of 2022, the university is still in the progress of providing the library with a new name.

In 2009, the library underwent a major $105 million renovation that was largely financed by a multimillion-dollar endowment from the Table Mountain Rancheria, a Casino operated by the Chukchansi tribes of California.

Michael Gorman, the former dean of the library, was the president of the American Library Association in 2005–2006.

Controversy

In November 2021, Fresno State University's president, Saúl Jiménez-Sandoval, announced that a task force had been created to investigate renaming the library due to recent information that had come to light concerning Henry Madden's "deeply held anti-Semitic views and Nazi sympathies." The task force reviewed documents which had been donated to the library after Madden's death. The documents were over 100,000 letters and documents curated by the former librarian and contained anti-Semitic and pro-Nazi views. “While Dr. Madden had the opportunity later in life to reflect on those views, there is no evidence that he renounced those views." On July 14, 2022, the Fresno State Board of Trustees voted to change the name of The Henry Madden Library to a new name.

Design
The newest, main building was designed by AC Martin and Partners and is based on elements derived from Native American basket weaving, as is evidenced in the façade and interior of the building.

Collections
The library contains 1.13 million volumes in 370,000 sq feet, placing it among the largest libraries in the California State University system. The library is home to the largest installation of compact shelving on any single floor in the United States. The shelves amount to over 20 miles in length. It is currently the third largest library in the CSU system (in terms of square footage), and among the top ten largest in the CSU system based on the number of volumes. It also is the largest academic building on the Fresno State campus.

The library features a number of special collections such as:
 The Arne Nixon Center for the Study of Children's Literature, a research center with over 55,000 books and manuscripts, the oldest dating back to 1865, one of the largest collections west of the Mississippi.
 Woodward Special Collections Research Center, containing the Central Valley Political Archive.
 15 Photographs by Ansel Adams
 Federal and California Government depository collection

The oldest book in the collection is a 1474 copy of Vita Christi (The life of Christ) by Ludolph of Saxony in two volumes, acquired in 1963.

References

External links

Main website

1911 establishments in California
Buildings and structures in Fresno, California
California State University, Fresno
Libraries in California
Library buildings completed in 1980